Muhammad bin 'Abd ar-Rahman bin 'Obayd Allah, known as Muhammad III was an Umayyad Caliph of Cordoba in Al-Andalus (Moorish Iberia). 

Muhammad III ruled after the death of Abd ar-Rahman V from 1024 to 1025 when the people of Córdoba revolted against him and he was forced to leave the city. It is believed that he died after being poisoned when he was 50 years old.  He was also the father of the famous poet Wallada bint al-Mustakfi.

External links

11th-century caliphs of Córdoba
Umayyad caliphs of Córdoba
Deaths by poisoning